Sheena Rose (born 1985) is a contemporary Caribbean multidisciplinary artist who lives and works in Barbados. She is a Fulbright Scholar and holds a BFA Honors degree from Barbados Community College, 2008, as well as an MFA from the University of North Carolina at Greensboro, 2016.

Career 
Sheena Rose has been a participant in the Havana Biennial, Venice Biennial, Gwangju Bienniale, Jamaica Biennial. In addition, she has exhibited her work in the MoCADA, Queens Museum, KMAC Museum, Turner Contemporary Gallery, and Residency Gallery. In 2019, her work was included in the Perez Art Museum Miami. The Weatherspoon Art Museum commissioned a mural from Rose, entitled "Pause and Breathe, We Got This," for their first-floor atrium space in 2021.

Rose has participated in many public art projects, such as designing bus shelters in Des Moines, Iowa and completing a two story mural at the Inter-American Development Bank in Washington, D.C., which also includes three of her paintings in its collection. Rose performed her piece Island and Monster at the Royal Academy of Arts, London and MoCADA, NYC in 2017.

Emma Watson listed Sheena Rose as one of her favorite artists in a 2018 Vogue article. Rose received the 2020–2021 "Distinguished Alumni Award" from UNC Greensboro's College of Visual and Performing Arts.

References 

1985 births
Living people
21st-century women artists
Barbadian artists
University of North Carolina alumni